Capacity loss or capacity fading is a phenomenon observed in rechargeable battery usage where the amount of charge a battery can deliver at the rated voltage decreases with use.

In 2003 it was reported the typical range of capacity loss in lithium-ion batteries after 500 charging and discharging cycles varied from 12.4% to 24.1%, giving an average capacity loss per cycle range of 0.025–0.048% per cycle.

Stress factors 
Capacity fading in Li-ion batteries occurs by a multitude of stress factors, including ambient temperature, discharge C-rate, and state of charge (SOC).

Capacity loss is strongly temperature-dependent, the aging rates increase with decreasing temperature below 25 °C, while above 25 °C aging is accelerated with increasing temperature.

Capacity loss is C-rate sensitive and higher C-rates lead to a faster capacity loss on a per cycle. Chemical mechanisms of degradation in a Li-ion battery dominate capacity loss at low C-rates, whereas, mechanical degradation dominates at high C-rates.

Graphite/LiCoO2 battery capacity degradation is reported to be affected by mean SOC as well as the change in SOC (ΔSOC) during the cycling operation. For the first 500 equivalent full cycles mean SOC is found to have a major effect on the capacity fade of cells as compared to ΔSOC. However, towards the end of the testing (600~800 equivalent cycles) ΔSOC becomes the major factor affecting the capacity loss rate of the cells.

See also 

 Recovery effect
 Nickel-iron battery, a battery that is highly resistant to capacity loss
 Memory effect

References

Battery charging
Product expiration
Rechargeable batteries